Empress Victoria may refer to

Queen Victoria of the United Kingdom (1819–1901), who was also Empress of India from 1876
Victoria, Princess Royal (1840–1901), her daughter, who was Empress Frederick ("Kaiserin Friedrich") in Germany
The Empress (hotel), in Victoria, British Columbia